Antennarius pauciradiatus, commonly known as the dwarf frogfish, is a species of fish in the family Antennariidae. It is native to the Western Atlantic where it is known from Colombia, Bermuda, Belize, Puerto Rico, the Bahamas, Antigua, and the Atlantic coast of Florida. It occurs at a depth range of 6–73 m (20–240 ft), and it reaches 6.3 cm (2.5 inches) in total length, making it the smallest frogfish in the Western Atlantic. It is mainly seen near reefs and patches of rock, and it is considered relatively uncommon.

References 

Antennariidae
Fish described in 1957
Fish of the Western Atlantic